Daniel David Luckenbill (Hamburg, Pennsylvania 21 June 1881 - London, 5 June 1927) was an American assyriologist and professor at the University of Chicago.

Publications 
Complete bibliography:
 John A. Maynard: In Memoriam: A Bibliography of D. D. Luckenbill. In: The American Journal of Semitic Languages and Literatures. 45, 1929, S. 90–93. (JSTOR)
 A Study of the temple documents from the Cassite period. The Chicago University Press, Chicago 1907. Thesis PhD (Digitalisat, Internet Archive)
 Annals of Sennacherib. The Chicago University Press, Chicago 1924. Reprint 2005. (Digitalisat des Oriental Institute OIP2; PDF; 6,3 MB).
 Ancient Records of Assyria and Babylonia. The Chicago University Press, Chicago 1926/1927. Mehrfache Reprints.
 Bd. 1 Historical records of Assyria: from the earliest times to Sargon.
 Bd. 2 Historical records of Assyria: from Sargon to the end.
 Inscriptions of Adab. The Chicago University Press, Chicago 1930. (Digitalisat des Oriental Institute OIP14; PDF; 3,9 MB).

Beiträge:
 The Temples of Babylonia and Assyria. In: The American Journal of Semitic Languages and Literatures. 24/4 1908, S. 291–322, (Auch: Sonderabdruck). (JSTOR).
 Inscriptions of Early Assyrian Rulers. In: The American Journal of Semitic Languages and Literatures. 28/3, 1912, S. 153–203                  . (JSTOR).
 Hittite Treaties and Letters. In: The American Journal of Semitic Languages and Literatures. 37/3, 1921, S. 161–211. (JSTOR).
 Biblical standards of history, chronology, and statistics. In: The Truth about the Bible. American Institute of Sacred Literature, Chicago 1923.
 Leroy Waterman: Daniel David Luckenbill, 1881–1927: An Appreciation. In: The American Journal of Semitic Languages and Literatures. 44, 1927, S. 1–5. (obituary).

References

External links
 

1881 births
1927 deaths
American Assyriologists
People from Hamburg, Pennsylvania
University of Chicago faculty